Hirtshals railway station ( or Hirtshals Banegård) is the main railway station serving the town of Hirtshals in Vendsyssel, Denmark.

The station is the northern terminus of the Hirtshalsbanen railway line from Hjørring to Hirtshals. The station opened in 1925 and was moved to its current location in 1928. The train services are currently operated by Nordjyske Jernbaner which run frequent local train services between Hirtshals and Hjørring with onward connections from Hjørring to the rest of Denmark.

History 

The station opened in 1925 to serve as terminus of the new railway line from Hjørring to Hirtshals which was built during the construction of the Port of Hirtshals in the period from 1919 to 1931. However, the original station was located some distance from the city center, and in 1928 the station was moved east to its current location closer to the port.

Architecture 

The original station building from 1925 was built by the Danish architect Sylvius Knutzen. It was designed in the grand style characteristic of the railway lines of the railway company Hjørring Privatbaner. It still exists and now houses different offices and meeting facilities.

After a number of years with a temporary solution, the port's former administration building, which had been built in 1919, was rebuilt into a station building and post office, and the current station building was thus taken into use in 1939.

Operations

Train services 
The train services are currently operated by Nordjyske Jernbaner which run frequent local train services from Hirtshals station to Hjørring station with onward connections from Hjørring to the rest of Denmark.

An international passenger service, Nordpilen, between Hirtshals and Hamburg, connecting with the ferries to and from Norway, ceased many years ago.

See also
 List of railway stations in Denmark

References

Notes

Bibliography

External links

 Nordjyske Jernbaner – Danish railway company operating in North Jutland Region
 Danske Jernbaner – website with information on railway history in Denmark
 Nordjyllands Jernbaner – website with information on railway history in North Jutland

Railway stations in the North Jutland Region
Railway stations opened in 1925
Hirtshals
Sylvius Knutzen railway stations
Railway stations in Denmark opened in the 20th century